Antony Alves Santos (born 8 September 2001), known as just Antony, is a Brazilian professional footballer who plays as a forward for Portuguese club Arouca on loan from Joinville.

Playing career
Antony began his senior career with Joinville, before joining Corinthians on loan in March 2021. He made his professional debut with Corinthians in a 2–2 Campeonato Paulista tie with Palmeiras on 3 March 2021. On 20 July 2021, he signed a 3-year contract with Arouca in the Portuguese Primeira Liga.

References

External links
 

2001 births
Living people
Brazilian footballers
Association football goalkeepers
Joinville Esporte Clube players
Sport Club Corinthians Paulista players
F.C. Arouca players
Primeira Liga players
Campeonato Brasileiro Série D players
Brazilian expatriate footballers
Brazilian expatriate sportspeople in Portugal
Expatriate footballers in Portugal